Europeans United for Democracy – Alliance for a Europe of Democracies, formerly known as EUDemocrats, was a Eurosceptic and self-described Eurorealist alliance of parties and movements from 15 European countries. It operated as a transnational party at the European level (European political party), according to Regulation (EC) No 2004/2003. It incorporated members from both the left and right of the political spectrum.

The party was set up under Danish law on 7 November 2005 and founded as a European Party in Brussels on 8 November 2005. Its first congress was held on 24 February 2006. Former Danish MEPs Jens-Peter Bonde and Hanne Dahl inspired the EUD's creation and first years. In January 2009, Swedish economist and former MEP Sören Wibe succeeded Bonde as President of the EUD. Following Wibe's sudden death in December 2010, former Irish Green MEP Patricia McKenna was named president of the EUD and Lave Knud Broch from People's Movement against the EU as vice president.

The EUD's platform was not concerned with specific matters of right or left wing ideology because it believed that such issues are best considered by national and regional parliaments under their citizens’ democratic control. It was committed to enhancing transparency, subsidiarity, diversity and budget control in the European Union.

In 2009, four of its affiliated MEPs were members of the Independence and Democracy group in the European Parliament. Also, two affiliated MEPs - Roger Helmer and Daniel Hannan, both British Conservatives - sat as independents. Hannan left EUD in October 2009 to join the newly formed Alliance of European Conservatives and Reformists, while Helmer defected from the British Conservatives to British party UKIP. From 2010 to 2014 EUD had one member in the European Parliament: Rina Ronja Kari (replaced Søren Søndergaard 5 February 2014), who sits as an associate member of the European United Left/Nordic Green Left Group. In the 2014 European Parliament elections two EUD members Rina Ronja Kari and Iveta Grigule were elected.

Ten members of national and regional parliaments from ten countries were also members of the EUD (as of 2014).

Political platform 

The political aim of the EUDemocrats was to reform the present structures of the European Union. According to its political platform, the EUD believed that decisions should be made at the lowest possible level (subsidiarity), thus giving an effective voice to the citizens of member states, regions and national minorities. It aimed to unite those who are critical of the EU for its undemocratic development and its ever-more centralising political features.

The EUD was opposed to the centralisation of political power in EU institutions, and demanded democratic scrutiny and control over EU institutional powers and actions by national and regional assemblies.

Its four political core objectives were:

enhancing transparency on all political levels, especially in the EU by giving citizens insight into all documents and meetings;
strengthen real subsidiarity in the EU thus taking decisions at the lowest political level possible;
improving democracy and accountability by reforming EU institutions and structures making them function more democratically;
defending diversity in the EU by making it possible for member states to implement politics according to their national reality and by promoting flexible cooperation instead of fixed harmonisation.

The operational aim of EUD was to act as an effective political platform and campaigning organisation which is able to influence pan-European politics towards extending democratic structures in the EU. The EUD also sought to have candidates elected in European elections that shared its core Eurorealist political ideas and thus influence politics in the European Parliament itself.

Campaigns

In March 2011, the EUDemocrats launched a campaign against the idea of direct-tax income for the European Union (including a tax on citizens, the banking sector, or the air traffic sector. The campaign was launched as www.noeutax.com.

In an effort to bring balance to the euro debate in the Baltics, EUDemocrats has started a Latvian web information campaign at www.parlatu.lv.

Membership 
: 
Michael Balter, Vivant group leader at the Parliament of the Deutschsprachige Gemeinschaft Belgiens

: 
People's Movement against the EU

: 
Arise the Republic (Debout la République) 
MP Nicolas Dupont-Aignan

: 
National Platform
People's Movement
Independent TD Thomas Pringle

:
Euro Sceptic Party (Euro Scettici – Partito Animalista Italiano)

:
MEP Iveta Grigule
Eiroskeptiķu Rīcības Partija (Eiroskeptiķu Rīcības Partija)
Demokrāti.lv

: 
Direct Democracy (Slovakia) (Priama Demokracia - Hnutie Domova)
Rudolf Kusy member of the regional parliament of Bratislava
Peter Kopecký

: 
June List (Junijska lista)
EUDemocrats Slovenia (EUDS)
Gorazd Drevensek

: 
June List (Junilistan)

Notes

References 
 Laure Neumayer: Euroscepticism as a political label; in: European Journal of Political Research 2/2007.
 Géraud de Ville: Eurosceptics are Eurocritics or Eurorealists; in: Politeia 10/2007.

External links
EUDemocrats official site
Independence and Democracy group in the European Parliament official site
Swedish EUD blog
European Referendum Campaign official site
Article by Géraud de Ville in Politeia: Eurosceptics are Eurocritics or Eurorealists.
Article by Jens-Peter Bonde in the EUObserver: New composition of the European Parliament should be a wake-up call.

Political parties established in 2005
Pan-European political parties
2005 establishments in the European Union
Eurosceptic parties
Political parties disestablished in 2017